Santiago Ramos Mingo (born 21 November 2001) is an Argentine professional footballer who plays as a centre-back for Defensa y Justicia, on loan from the Belgian Pro League club Oud-Heverlee Leuven.

Career
Before the second half of 2019–20, Mingo signed for Spanish La Liga side Barcelona. In 2022, he signed for OH Leuven in Belgium  but he never featured in the first team and instead only played for the U23 team playing at the third level, where he gained 18 caps and scored 3 goals. Early 2023, OH Leuven loaned Ramos Mingo to Defensa y Justicia for the remainder of 2023, with an option to buy.

References

External links
 
  
 

Living people
2001 births
Argentine footballers
Association football defenders
Primera Federación players
Segunda División B players
Belgian Pro League players
Argentine Primera División players
Boca Juniors footballers
FC Barcelona Atlètic players
Oud-Heverlee Leuven players
Defensa y Justicia footballers
Argentine expatriate footballers
Argentine expatriate sportspeople in Belgium
Expatriate footballers in Belgium
Argentine expatriate sportspeople in Spain
Expatriate footballers in Spain